Bacolod–Silay Airport, also referred to as Bacolod–Silay International Airport, is the main airport serving the general area of Metro Bacolod, in the Western Visayas region of the Philippines.

The facility inherited its IATA and ICAO airport codes from Bacolod City Domestic Airport, which it replaced in 2008. Capable of handling international air traffic, the airport is the busier of the two major airports serving Negros Island, the other being Dumaguete Airport in Sibulan, Negros Oriental.

Despite being billed as an international airport, Bacolod–Silay is designated as a class 1 principal domestic airport by the Civil Aviation Authority of the Philippines, a body of the Department of Transportation that is responsible for the operations of not only this airport but also of all other public airports in the Philippines except the major international airports.

History
The site of Bacolod–Silay Airport was one of the main airfields for the Imperial Japanese Army Air Service (IJAAS) bombers and fighters in Negros. It was captured by American forces in 1944 and 1945. After the war, parts of the airfield became a sugarcane plantation.

Planning for a new airport for Bacolod commenced in 1997, when the Japan International Cooperation Agency initiated a study indicating the need for expansion at four Philippine airports: namely Bacolod City Domestic Airport, Mandurriao Airport in Iloilo City, Legazpi Airport in Legazpi and Daniel Z. Romualdez Airport in Tacloban.

In February 1999, another JICA study was commissioned, this time on the detailed plan of the new airport.  The study was completed by March 2000 and was funded by a 430 million-yen grant. Immediately after the completion of the study, JICA hired Pacific Consultants International as advisers to the project.

The project was opened for bidding on August 25, 2003, with the winning bid going to the Takenaka–Itochu Joint Venture (TIJV). Physical construction on the new 4.3 billion-peso airport, funded in part by an 8.2 billion yen loan, commenced in August 2004. A 900-day deadline was imposed for the airport to be completed, which broadly corresponded to January 2007. During construction, remains of the Japanese airfield and some war aircraft wrecks were dug.

On July 13, 2007, President Gloria Macapagal Arroyo attended the facility's inauguration. The airport was considered complete by July 16, but there was "considerable debate" over whether the airport should be opened for regular commercial traffic due to the  runway extension, necessary for accommodating larger aircraft, not having been built by that time.

The first aircraft ever to land at the airport was a small fourteen-seater turboprop owned by Vincent Aviation. The Reims-Cessna F406 with aircraft registration number ZK-VAF, piloted by Steve Gray of New Zealand landed at the airport on September 26, 2007, at 9:55 a.m.

The airport commenced regular commercial operations and was officially opened on January 18, 2008. The first commercial flight to arrive was Cebu Pacific's Flight 5J 473 from Manila, an Airbus A319-100 piloted by Silay native Captain Allan Garces which landed at 5:22 a.m. PST on the day of opening. The first international flight to arrive at the airport was a chartered plane from Almaty, Kazakhstan which landed at 10:58 a.m. on January 2, 2009 carrying eight passengers and eight crew members.

Zest Air chartered international flights to and from Incheon using the Airbus A320 from January 7 to February 22, 2012, and also used to serve the route seasonally for South Korean golfers. This seasonal route was also operated by Philippine Airlines utilizing the Airbus A321 from December 24, 2015, to February 21, 2016, offering flights to tourists, non-golfers, and the local flying public.

By late 2014, the airport has been equipped with Customs, Immigration and Quarantine booths in preparation for the increase in international arrivals. Since October 2015 the Bureau of Immigration has also indicated readiness to deploy personnel at the airport should regularly scheduled international flights commence, but as of 2022, there are no regularly scheduled international flights operating to and from the airport.

Structure

Runway
The runway runs in a direction of 03°/21°, and can currently handle aircraft as large as the Airbus A330. Provisions for a  expansion of the present runway in order to accommodate even larger aircraft were confirmed on May 23, 2009, when it was reported that the budget for the construction of the 500-meter extension of the runway has been approved by the Philippine government and bidding and construction was slated to start in the 3rd or 4th quarter of 2009, but it has not been expanded yet.

The airport is equipped with an instrument landing system (ILS), making it capable of handling night and low-visibility landings.

Passenger terminal

The largest building in the complex is the  main passenger terminal with three levels. The ground floor holds the check-in counters, the public concourse, the arrival area and the information counter. The second floor has the three pre-departure areas with their VIP and CIP lounges; these pre-departure areas lead out to three jet bridges at an apron that can handle up to five aircraft simultaneously. Philippine Airlines also operates a Mabuhay Lounge for the use of its business class passengers on the second floor. Also on the second floor are Merci Pasalubong Shop and Bong-Bong's Pasalubong Shop, occupying the spot of the former Civil Aviation Authority of the Philippines office since it transferred to the Administration Building. On the third floor is the viewing deck with a concession area and rooms for maintenance and airport machinery.

The state-of-the-art main passenger terminal is equipped with a flight information display system, mechanized baggage handling systems for both inbound and outbound baggage, numerous security x-ray machines, and elevators, and escalators. Outside the main terminal is a parking lot good for 350 cars.

Airlines and destinations

Statistics
Data from Civil Aviation Authority of the Philippines (CAAP).

Ground transportation
Airport transportation is accessible to passengers travelling in or out of the airport from Bacolod. There are multiple Public Utility Vehicles (PUVs) that offer shuttle services. There are also tricycles outside the airport that provide transportation to nearby destinations in Silay. The new access road connecting the airport and Bacolod is completed and is now accessible to vehicles. It connects to Barangay Bata in Bacolod.

See also
Bacolod City Domestic Airport
List of airports in the Philippines

References

Airports in the Philippines
Metro Bacolod
Buildings and structures in Silay
Transportation in the Visayas
Itochu